Majengo is an administrative ward in Tanga District of Tanga Region in Tanzania. 
According to the 2012 census, the ward has a total population of 7,482.

References

Wards of Tanga Region